Dave Taynor is an American football coach. He served as the head football coach at his alma mater, Urbana University in Urbana, Ohio from 2008 to 2014 and Lock Haven University of Pennsylvania in Lock Haven, Pennsylvania from 2015 to 2019.

Head coaching record

References

External links
 Lock Haven profile

Year of birth missing (living people)
Living people
Culver–Stockton Wildcats football coaches
Lock Haven Bald Eagles football coaches
Louisville Cardinals football coaches
Urbana Blue Knights football coaches
Wisconsin–Stevens Point Pointers football coaches
People from Lock Haven, Pennsylvania